Carl Westerlund may refer to:

 Carl Agardh Westerlund (1831–1908), Swedish malacologist
 Carl Wilhelm Westerlund (1809–1879), Finnish stage actor and theatre director
 Carl Julius Alvin Westerlund (1885–1952), Norwegian politician